Nine Barrow Down is an elongated hill forming the northern ridge of the Purbeck Hills on the Isle of Purbeck in Dorset, England. The chalk down is part of the extensive Southern England Chalk Formation. The eastern end of the ridge, which carries the highest point, is also sometimes known as Godlingston Hill.  The col of the railway cutting at Harman's Cross means that it has sufficient relative height that it qualifies as a Marilyn.

The hill has views to the north across Poole Harbour. On a clear day it is possible to see as far as the Spinnaker Tower in Portsmouth. To the south is the other ridge of the Purbeck Hills including Swyre Head. To the south-east Swanage and its Bay can be seen.  Along the ridge there are nine barrows — stone age burial mounds — hence the name.

Until recently the hill was topped with a trig point, but this has been removed by the farmer with the permission of Ordnance Survey: the trig point and its concrete base can be seen on its side just to the south of the bridleway. The highest point is within a field marked "No public access".

Ecologically the ridge is largely calcareous grassland grazed by cattle, sheep and rabbits, with limited arable use.
It is also the site for the 2 kW Heart South Coast Transmitter on 102.3 and for the NOW Digital Multiplexes.

Hills of Dorset
Marilyns of England
Isle of Purbeck